MV Carnarvon Castle was an ocean liner of the Union-Castle Line. She was requisitioned for service as an auxiliary cruiser by the Royal Navy during the Second World War.

Construction and early career
Carnarvon Castle was built by Harland and Wolff, Belfast and launched on 14 January 1926. She was completed on 26 June 1926 and entered service for the Union-Castle Line. She was named after Caernarfon Castle. She was the first of the Union-Castle mail ships to exceed 20,000 tons and was the first motor ship to be used on the sailings between Britain and the Cape of Good Hope. She had two squat funnels, the foremost being a dummy. She served on the route until 1936, when a revised contract to carry the mails required a speed of at least , which would result in a voyage to the Cape lasting no more than 13 and a half days. Carnarvon Castle required a refit and was reworked by her original builders between 1937 and 1938. Her engines were replaced, a single funnel replaced the original two and her passenger capacity was altered. After undergoing sea trials on 26 June 1938, she returned to her original route on 8 July, setting a new record for the passage to the Cape of 12 days, 13 hours, 38 minutes. The record stood until 1954.

War service
Carnarvon Castle was at Cape Town at the outbreak of the Second World War, and was requisitioned by the Royal Navy on 8 September 1939. She sailed to the naval base at Simonstown and was converted to an armed merchant cruiser. Commissioned as HMS Carnarvon Castle on 9 October, she sailed into the South Atlantic. She suffered heavily in the battle, sustaining 27 hits and suffering 4 dead and 27 wounded. Thor was apparently undamaged in the encounter.

Carnarvon Castles career as an armed merchant cruiser came to an end when she was decommissioned in December 1943. There were plans to convert her into an aircraft carrier but these were abandoned and she underwent a conversion to a troopship at New York City in 1944. She remained on trooping duties after the war and was finally released from naval service in March 1947. Returned to her original owners, she was back on the route to South Africa by June 1947.  With her trooping accommodation only marginally upgraded, she carried a flood of post war emigrants from Britain on low cost assisted passages to East and South Africa. She was again refitted, to more luxurious standards, by Harland and Wolff in early 1949. Resuming service on 15 June 1950, she served until her retirement and sale. She arrived at Mihara, Japan on 8 September 1963 and was scrapped.

References

Bibliography

External links

1926 ships
Ships built by Harland and Wolff
Ships built in Belfast
World War II Auxiliary cruisers of the Royal Navy
World War II auxiliary ships of the United Kingdom
Troop ships of the Royal Navy
Uruguay in World War II
Ships of the Union-Castle Line